The Pahranagat Valley is a Tonopah Basin landform in Lincoln County, Nevada.

It has four lakes, two near the north end of the valley (Nesbitt Lake and Frenchie Lake) and two towards the south end (Upper Pahranagat Lake and Lower Pahranagat Lake). The southern half of  the valley including the two lakes is home to the Pahranagat Valley National Wildlife Refuge.

Pahranagat Valley is bordered on the west by a range of mountains called the Mount Irish Range and then the Pahranagat Range. It is bordered on the east by the Hiko Range. State Route 318 and then U.S. Route 93 traverse the entire length of the valley.

The more inhabited areas in Pahranagat Valley include (from north to south) Hiko, Ash Springs, Richardville and Alamo, the town of Alamo being the largest and where all of the schools for the valley are located.

History
The Crystal Springs area, used as a watering spot and campsite, was a principal stop-over on the Mormon Trail Alternate Route.  In the late 1850s, the area was a haven for outlaws who pastured hundreds of head of stolen cattle and horses on its meadows.

Silver ore was discovered in 1865 on Mount Irish, and Logan sprang briefly into existence. A mill to process the ore was built in Hiko, the ruins of which are still in existence.

Since the late 19th century, Pahranagat Valley has been primarily an agricultural community. Presently it is also a bedroom community for many who work in Las Vegas even though the commute is over  one way.

Geology

The geology of the region includes the Alamo meteor impact which scattered layers of impact debris across the area near Alamo.

Flora and fauna
The Pahranagat Valley is home of several endangered species like Fluminicola merriami, Bufo nelsoni and endemic subspecies of Gila robusta, Rhinichthys osculus, Crenichthys baileyi, and Microtus montanus.

References

External links
 Nevada State Historic Preservation Office
 Ghosttowns.com
 History of Lincoln County

Valleys of Lincoln County, Nevada
Regions of Nevada
Valleys of Nevada